A. Elizabeth Jones (born 1948) is an American diplomat and government official who served as the United States Ambassador to Kazakhstan from 1995 to 1998 and Assistant Secretary of State for European and Eurasian Affairs from 2001 to 2005. She was promoted to the rank of Career Ambassador in 2004. Most recently Jones served as Chargée d'affaires to India from 2022 to 2023.

Early life and education
Jones was born in Munich to parents in the U.S. Foreign Service. She grew up in Moscow and Berlin, where she attended local schools. She is a graduate of Swarthmore College and Boston University.

Terrorism in Central Asia
Jones testified as Assistant Secretary of State on the threat of terrorism in Central Asia before the United States House of Representatives' subcommittee on the Middle East and Central Asia on 29 October 2003. Jones said the greatest threats to the Central Asian states are the Islamic Movement of Uzbekistan, which she described as an Islamic terrorist organization, as well as Hizb ut-Tahrir, which praises attacks on U.S. troops in Iraq. She said that despite the death of IMU leader Juma Namangani, the "IMU is still active in the region – particularly in Kyrgyzstan, Tajikistan, Uzbekistan, and Kazakhstan – and it represents a serious threat to the region and therefore to our interests."

Post-retirement career
In 2022, Jones was appointed Chargée d'affaires ad interim at the U.S. Embassy in New Delhi until her succession by Eric Garcetti in March 2023.

Notes

References

External links

1948 births
Living people
People from Munich
Ambassadors of the United States to Kazakhstan
Ambassadors of the United States to India
United States Career Ambassadors
American women ambassadors
German expatriates in the United States
German expatriates in Kazakhstan
German expatriates in India
Clinton administration controversies
George W. Bush administration personnel
Biden administration personnel
Swarthmore College alumni
Boston University alumni
20th-century American women
21st-century American women
20th-century American diplomats
21st-century American diplomats